Páramo, from the Spanish word for "desolate territory", may refer to a variety of alpine tundra ecosystems located in the Andes Mountain Range, South America.

Páramo may also refer to:
 Páramo Leonés, a comarca in León Province, Spain
 Páramo (Teverga), a village in Asturias, Spain
 Páramo de Boedo, a municipality located in Palencia province, Castile-León, Spain
 Páramo del Sil, a municipality located in El Bierzo region, Castile-León, Spain
 O Páramo, a municipality in Galicia, Spain
 Páramo, Santander, a municipality in the Santander department, Colombia
 Pedro Páramo, a novel
 Pedro Páramo (1967 film), Mexican film based on the novel
 Luz en el páramo, a 1953 Venezuelan film 
 Páramo Directional Clothing, a British clothing company
 Paramo (butterfly), a genus of butterflies

See also
 Páramos (disambiguation)